The Ekalulia Formation is a Neoproterozoic geologic formation found in Nunavut, Canada. It consists of a series of massive continental flood basalt lava flows of the Mackenzie Large Igneous Province with a thickness of 300–500 m. The flood basalts are green, composed of olivine and contain minor pillows.

See also
Volcanology of Canada
Volcanology of Eastern Canada
Volcanology of Northern Canada
Volcanology of Western Canada

References

Mackenzie Large Igneous Province
Flood basalts
Neoproterozoic volcanism
Stratigraphy of Nunavut